The men's cross-country mountain biking event at the 2020 Summer Olympics took place on 26 July 2021 at the Izu MTB Course, Izu, Shizuoka. 38 cyclists from 29 nations competed.

Background 

This was the 7th appearance of the event, which has been held at every Summer Olympics since mountain bike cycling was added to the programme in 1996.

The reigning Olympic champion was Nino Schurter of Switzerland, and the reigning (2020) World Champion was Jordan Sarrou of France.

A preview by Olympics.com noted Schurter (bronze in 2008, silver in 2012, and gold in 2016, along with 8 World Championships) as a favourite. Other contenders include Mathieu van der Poel of the Netherlands, Victor Koretzky of France, and Luca Braidot of Italy, while Tom Pidcock of Great Britain was rated as a talented outside bet for the title.

Qualification 

A National Olympic Committee (NOC) could enter up to 3 qualified cyclists in the cross-country. Quota places are allocated to the NOC, which selects the cyclists. Qualification is primarily through the UCI nation rankings, with 30 of the 38 quota places available through that pathway. The top 2 NOCs earned 3 quota places. NOCs ranked 3rd through 7th earned 2 quota places. NOCs ranked 8th through 21st earned 1 quota places. The second path to qualification was continental tournaments for Africa, the Americas, and Asia; the top NOC at each tournament (which had not already earned a quota place) received 1 place. The third path was the 2019 UCI Mountain Bike World Championships. The top 2 NOCs (without a quota place yet) in the Elite category earned a place; the top 2 NOCs in the U-23 category (without a quota, including through the Elite category) also earned a place. The host nation was reserved one place, to be reallocated through the rankings if Japan earned a place normally. Because qualification was complete by the end of the 2020 UCI Track Cycling World Championships on 1 March 2020 (the last event that contributed to the 2018–20 rankings), qualification was unaffected by the COVID-19 pandemic.

Competition format 

The competition is a mass-start, seven-lap race. There is only one round of competition. Riders with times 80% slower than the leader's first lap are eliminated.

Start list

Results

References 

Men's cross-country
Cycling at the Summer Olympics – Men's cross-country
2021 in mountain biking
Men's events at the 2020 Summer Olympics